The rulers of the Wadai Sultanate ruled a territory today located in the north of the Republic of Chad.

See also
Chad
List of heads of state of Chad
List of prime ministers of Chad
List of colonial governors of Chad
Lists of incumbents

Political history of Chad
Lists of African rulers
rulers of Wadai